KLSX (99.1 FM) was a radio station licensed to Rozet, Wyoming, United States. The station was owned by Family Voice Communications, LLC.

The station's owners surrendered its license to the Federal Communications Commission on June 5, 2018; the FCC cancelled the license the same day.

References

External links
 

Campbell County, Wyoming
LSX
Radio stations established in 2010
2010 establishments in Wyoming
Radio stations disestablished in 2018
2018 disestablishments in Wyoming
Defunct radio stations in the United States
LSX